The Kinnickinnic Church is a historic church in Kinnickinnic, Wisconsin, United States. The Greek Revival church was constructed for $2,000 in 1868 and was originally shared by a Methodist and a Congregationalist congregation. In 1895, the Congregationalists purchased the church for $300; it maintained a congregation there until 1951. In 1962, the Kinnickinnic Historical Association bought the vacant church to prevent it from being converted to a home. The church, which contains a historic pump organ, is currently used for social events in the community. On October 6, 2000, the church was added to the National Register of Historic Places.

References

External links
St. Croix Heritage-Kinnickinnic Church
Wisconsin Historical Society property record with images

Churches on the National Register of Historic Places in Wisconsin
Greek Revival church buildings in Wisconsin
Churches completed in 1868
Churches in St. Croix County, Wisconsin
National Register of Historic Places in St. Croix County, Wisconsin